The 1820 United Kingdom general election was triggered by the death of King George III and produced the first parliament of the reign of his successor, King George IV. It was held shortly after the Radical War in Scotland and the Cato Street Conspiracy. In this atmosphere, the Tories under the Earl of Liverpool were able to win a substantial majority over the Whigs.

The sixth United Kingdom Parliament was dissolved on 29 February 1820. The new Parliament was summoned to meet on 21 April 1820, for a maximum seven-year term from that date. The maximum term could be and normally was curtailed, by the monarch dissolving the Parliament before its term expired.

Political situation
The Tory leader was the Earl of Liverpool, who had been Prime Minister since his predecessor's assassination in 1812. Liverpool had led his party to two general election victories before that of 1820. The Tory Leader of the House of Commons was Robert Stewart, Viscount Castlereagh.

The Whig Party continued to suffer from weak leadership, particularly in the House of Commons.

At the time of the general election, the Earl Grey was the leading figure amongst the Whig peers. It was likely that Grey would have been invited to form a government, had the Whigs come to power, although in this era the monarch rather than the governing party decided which individual would be Prime Minister.

The Leader of the Opposition in the House of Commons, George Tierney, was successful at first after the Whig gains at the 1818 general election. However, on 18 May 1819, Tierney moved a motion in the House of Commons for a committee on the state of the nation. This motion was defeated by 357 to 178. Foord comments that "this defeat put an effective end to Tierney's leadership". However he continued to be the nominal leader at the time of the 1820 election.

Dates of election
At this period there was not one election day. After receiving a writ (a royal command) for the election to be held, the local returning officer fixed the election timetable for the particular constituency or constituencies he was concerned with. Polling in seats with contested elections could continue for many days. It was triggered by the death of King George III.

The general election took place between the first contest on 6 March and the last contest on 14 April 1820.

Summary of the constituencies

Monmouthshire (1 County constituency with 2 MPs and one single member Borough constituency) is included in Wales in these tables. Sources for this period may include the county in England.

Table 1: Constituencies and MPs, by type and country 

Table 2: Number of seats per constituency, by type and country

See also
 United Kingdom general elections

References
 British Electoral Facts 1832–1999, compiled and edited by Colin Rallings and Michael Thrasher (Ashgate Publishing Ltd 2000). Source: Dates of Elections – Footnote to Table 5.02
 British Historical Facts 1760–1830, by Chris Cook and John Stevenson (The Macmillan Press 1980). Source: Types of constituencies – Great Britain
 His Majesty's Opposition 1714–1830, by Archibald S. Foord (Oxford University Press 1964)
 Parliamentary Election Results in Ireland 1801–1922, edited by B.M. Walker (Royal Irish Academy 1978). Source: Types of constituencies – Ireland

1820 elections in the United Kingdom
General election
1820
1820s elections in Ireland